Uredo kriegeriana is a fungal plant pathogen infecting hemp.

References 

Fungal plant pathogens and diseases
Hemp diseases
Teliomycotina
Fungi described in 1902
Taxa named by Hans Sydow
Taxa named by Paul Sydow